"Crazy for You" is a song by British pop music trio Let Loose, released in April 1993 as their debut single from their self-titled album. It was written by Richie Wermerling and produced by Nicky Graham. The original 1993 release reached  44 in the United Kingdom. On 13 June 1994, "Crazy for You" was re-issued in the UK and attained a new peak of No. 2 on the UK Singles Chart. It became the UK's eighth-best-selling single of 1994.

Speaking to Digital Spy in 2009, Wermerling said of the song and its success: "I wrote the song myself and knew it was a bit prettier than some of my other ones, but I didn't think it would pick up as much as it did. It was around for months and even I had to turn off the radio after a while. I'm pleased though as it still pays for the bacon in the morning now!"

Track listings

1993 release

UK and Australian CD single
 "Crazy for You" (7-inch) – 4:19
 "Crazy for You" (Loose Mix) – 6:06
 "Cardboard City" – 4:34
 "Crazy for You" (Reg Mix) – 4:18

UK 7-inch and cassette single, European CD single
 "Crazy for You" – 4:19
 "Cardboard City" – 4:34

1994 re-issue

UK and Australian CD single
 "Crazy for You" – 4:09
 "Cardboard City" – 4:34
 "Candy Stripe" – 4:51
 "Start a New Day" – 4:43

UK 7-inch and cassette single
 "Crazy for You" – 4:09
 "Start a New Day" – 4:43

UK 12-inch single
 "Crazy for You" (Wild Fruit N.R.G. Mix) – 7:57
 "Crazy for You" (Wild Fruit Club Mix) – 7:55
 "Seventeen" (The Wild Fruit Mix) – 7:35
 "Crazy for You" (radio mix) – 4:12

Personnel
Let Loose
 Richie Wermerling – lead vocals, keyboards
 Rob Jeffrey – guitar, backing vocals
 Lee Murray – drums, backing vocals

Production
 Nicky Graham – producer of "Crazy for You"
 Let Loose – producers of "Cardboard City", "Start a New Day" and "Candy Stripe", remixing on "Crazy for You"
 Matt Kemp – engineer on "Crazy for You" and "Cardboard City", remixing on "Crazy for You"

Other
 Simon Fowler – photography (1993 release)
 Mainartery – design (1993 and 1994 releases)
 Mike Diver – photography, montage (1994 release)

Charts

Weekly charts

Year-end charts

Certifications

Release history

References

1993 debut singles
1993 songs
1994 singles
Let Loose songs
Mercury Records singles
Number-one singles in Israel
Vertigo Records singles